Manggarai is an administrative village in Tebet district, South Jakarta, Indonesia. It has postal code of 12850.

Transportation
 Manggarai railway station

See also 
 Tebet
 List of administrative villages of Jakarta

Administrative villages in Jakarta